Gangasangamam is a 1971 Indian Malayalam-language film, directed by J. D. Thottan and written by Ponkunnam Varkey. The film stars Prem Nazir, Jayabharathi, Thikkurissy Sukumaran Nair and Jesey. It is based on Varkey's play of the same name.

Plot

Cast

Soundtrack 
The music was composed by G. Devarajan and the lyrics were written by Vayalar Ramavarma.

References

External links 
 

1970s Malayalam-language films
1971 films
Films directed by J. D. Thottan
Indian films based on plays